Nadezhda Aleksieva (born 14 August 1969) is a Bulgarian biathlete. She competed at the 1992 Winter Olympics and the 1994 Winter Olympics.

References

External links
 

1969 births
Living people
Biathletes at the 1992 Winter Olympics
Biathletes at the 1994 Winter Olympics
Bulgarian female biathletes
Olympic biathletes of Bulgaria